The 1991 Oklahoma Sooners football team represented the University of Oklahoma during the 1991 NCAA Division I-A football season. They played their home games at Oklahoma Memorial Stadium and competed as members of the Big Eight Conference. They were coached by third-year head coach Gary Gibbs.

Schedule

Personnel

Rankings

Postseason

NFL Draft

The following players were drafted into the National Football League following the season.

References

Oklahoma
Oklahoma Sooners football seasons
Gator Bowl champion seasons
Oklahoma Sooners football